Antoine Méo (born 29 August 1984) is a French enduro rider and five-time world champion from 2010 to 2013 and 2015.

Career
A former motocross rider, he debuted in the World Enduro Championship in 2008 with Husqvarna, where he placed fifth. In the following year, Méo finished second to Mika Ahola in the E1 category. Continuing with Husqvarna, he won the world title in 2010 ahead of countryman Johnny Aubert. For the 2011 season, Méo moved to the E2 class and claimed his second title. He returned to the E1 class, winning the 2012 and 2013 titles with KTM.

In 2009 and 2010, he won the International Six Days Enduro (ISDE) World Trophy with the French national team.

Méo also won the Italian round of the 2007/08 FIM Indoor Enduro World Cup. In 2009/10 he got a second-place finish at the first race in Great Britain.

He competed in the 2016 Dakar Rally, a rally raid competition which takes place annually in South America, riding for the factory Red Bull KTM team. In his first attempt he won the 11th stage and finished 7th overall. He returned in 2018, again winning a stage and improving to 4th overall.

Career summary

ISDE

References

External links

Profile at EWC

1984 births
Enduro riders
French motocross riders
Living people
Dakar Rally drivers